The Fútbol Club Satélites, commonly known as Satélites, was a Mexican football club based in Tulancingo. The club was founded in 1995, and played in the Serie B of Liga Premier.

Players

Current squad

References 

Association football clubs established in 1995
Football clubs in Hidalgo (state)
1995 establishments in Mexico
Liga Premier de México